"Thuggish Ruggish Bone" is the debut single by American hip hop group Bone Thugs-n-Harmony, from their debut EP Creepin on ah Come Up. It features local Cleveland singer Shatasha Williams. The song reached #20 on the Billboard Hot 100. The song was included in the soundtrack of the video game True Crime: Streets of LA; and the second half of Layzie Bone's verse was reused on the track "Family Scriptures" on the Mo Thugs Family debut album, Family Scriptures.

The music video (directed by Terry Heller) was shot near the Cuyahoga River on Cleveland's westside, near from the Lakeview Estates public housing units. The music video also featured rapper Eazy-E.

Track listing
Thuggish Ruggish Bone (EP Version) (featuring Shatasha Williams) (4:40)
Thuggish Ruggish Bone (Instrumental) (4:32)
Thuggish Ruggish Bone (A Capella) (4:40)

Intro – Calvin O. Butts
Chorus & Outro – Shatasha Williams
Verse 1 – Layzie Bone
Verse 2 – Wish Bone
Verse 3 – Krayzie Bone
Verse 4 – Bizzy Bone

Official versions
 Thuggish Ruggish Bone (A Cappella) (4:40)
 Thuggish Ruggish Bone (EP Version) (4:40)
 Thuggish Ruggish Bone (Instrumental) (4:32)

Remix
 Thuggish Ruggish Bone (U-Neek's Mix), appears on "Foe tha Love of $" single.

Charts

Weekly charts

Year-end charts

Certifications

Personnel
Featured Guest: Shatasha Williams
Producer: DJ U-Neek & Kenny McCloud
Executive Producer: Eazy-E
Recorded by: Kenny McCloud at The Blackhole Recording Studio
Additional Recording and Mixed by: Donovan "Tha Dirt Biker" Sound at Audio Achievement Studios
Mastered by: "Big Bass" Brian Gardner at Bernie Grundman Mastering
Published by: Ruthless Attack Muzick (ASCAP), Dollarz N Sense Muzick, Keenu Songs (BMI)

References

External links
 Bone Thugs-n-Harmony Official Website
 Ruthless Records Official Website
 Recording Industry Association of America

Bone Thugs-n-Harmony songs
1994 debut singles
Gangsta rap songs
G-funk songs
1994 songs
Ruthless Records singles
Songs written by DJ U-Neek
Songs written by Layzie Bone
Songs written by Bizzy Bone
Songs written by Wish Bone
Songs written by Krayzie Bone
Songs written by Flesh-n-Bone